Price of Love is a 2015 Ethiopian drama film directed by Hermon Hailay which was screened in the Official Selection at 2015 Toronto International Film Festival.

It was selected in Official Competition at FESPACO 2015 where it won the Special Prize of Ouagadougou. It has gone on to compete in numerous international film festivals and won multiple awards.

It tells the story of a young Addis Ababa taxi driver gets caught up in the dark side of love, causing his taxi to be stolen. He finds himself stuck in a relationship with a prostitute, making him confront his past and discover what is the price of love.

Awards and nominations

List of festival appearances

References

External links 
 
 

2015 films
2015 drama films
Ethiopian drama films
Amharic-language films